Sajad Jassim Mousa Al-Msharrafawee (born 7 January 1998) is an Iraqi footballer who plays as a midfielder for Al-Shorta in the Iraqi Premier League.

International career
On 12 January 2021, Sajad Jassim made his first international cap with Iraq against UAE in a friendly.

International goals

Honours

Club
Al-Shorta
Iraqi Super Cup: 2022

References

External links 
 

1998 births
Living people
Iraqi footballers
Iraq international footballers
Naft Al-Wasat SC players
Al-Shorta SC players
Association football defenders